Ruan Bay is a settlement adjacent to Frederiksted on the island of Saint Croix in the United States Virgin Islands. Its US Postal Service zip code is 00840.

References

Populated places in Saint Croix, U.S. Virgin Islands